Pecado de Amor (English title:Sin of Love) is a Venezuelan telenovela written by Mariela Romero and aired by Venevisión from 8 November 1995 to 21 January 1997, thus making it the longest running telenovela Venevisión has ever made. This telenovela lasted 325 episodes and was distributed internationally by Venevisión International.

Karina and Víctor Cámara starred as the protagonists with Joanna Benedek as the antagonist.

Synopsis

While still an adolescent, Consuelo Sanchez gets pregnant by her boyfriend, Adolfo Alamo. She soon finds out, however, that Adolfo is married to a rich alcoholic named Marisela, and that they have three children: Junior, Andreina and Rosalia. In spite of this, Consuelo goes ahead with her pregnancy and gives birth to a girl. But Consuelo's mother, Blanca, takes the baby away from her and abandons her at a small house in the city slums. This situation prompts Consuelo to leave home, determined to never see or speak to her mother again. The owner of the house, Carmen Rosa Barrios, takes in the abandoned baby, names her Rosa and raises her as her own. Many years later, Blanca, Rosa's real grandmother, unaware of the relationship between them, hires Carmen and Rosa as maids at a students’ residence managed by her. A series of events link the young people living at the boarding house with Rosa and her past. Mildred, an outstanding philosophy student, becomes Rosa's best friend. Alejandro Marquez, Rosalia Alamo’s fiance, falls in love with Rosa. A child is born of their relationship, but the scorned Rosalia manages to convince Alejandro that the baby's father is actually her brother, Junior Alamo. Meanwhile, Rosa's real mother, Consuelo, is living with Isaias Pena, a heavy drinker in need of counseling. When Consuelo takes Isaias to a meeting of Alcoholics Anonymous, she meets Marisela, not knowing that she is Adolfo Alamo's wife. This friendship leads to a surprise encounter between Consuelo and her teenage love, Adolfo, who is the father of her lost child... and to a dangerous rekindling of that old flame. Destiny also puts Consuelo in touch with Rosa. Without knowing that they are mother and daughter, they develop a very special, loving relationship. Later on, it is Consuelo who opens Rosa's eyes about what is happening in her life; she tells her that Junior and Rosalia, who have hurt her so much, are actually her half siblings, and that she is not Carmen's daughter but her own. Everyone endures deep suffering until Adolfo has a heart-to-heart talk with Rosa, and together they force Blanca to confess that she in fact took Rosa away from her mother and abandoned her at Carmen's house. Junior, ill with a terminal cancer also confesses to Alejandro that he was never Rosa's lover, and therefore not her baby's father. Adolfo convinces Marisela to give him a divorce, because he is still in love with Consuelo. Upon Junior's death, Rosa forgives Rosalia for her cruel schemes, and they finally accept each other as sisters; Alejandro and Rosa come together again, as well as Consuelo and Adolfo, and everyone prepares to forget the past and start a new life.

Cast

Karina as Rosa Álamo Sanchez
Víctor Cámara as Alejandro Márquez
Joanna Benedek as Rosalia Alamo
Amanda Gutierrez as Consuelo Sanchez
Gustavo Rodríguez as Adolfo Alamo
Denise Novell as Natalia
Javier Valcarcel as Junior Alamo
Elba Escobar as Marisela de Alamo
Emma Rabbe as Indira
Viviana Gibelli as Esperanza Hernandez
Isabel Moreno as Amalia Marquez
Hector Myerston as Aureliano
Jorge Aravena as Fernando
Raquel Castanos as Rosa
Alberto Marin
Carlos Oliver
Maurico Renteria 
Gigi Zancheta
Dulce Ma. Pilonieta
Eva Blanco
Lucy Orta
Ma. de Lourdes Devonish
Estelita del Llano
Marta Carbillo
Eva Mondolfi
Lucio Bueno
Alexis Escamez
Humberto Tancredi
Omar Moinelo
Aitor Gaviria
Ricardo Hernandez
Luis Gerardo Nunez

References

External links

Opening credits

1995 telenovelas
Venevisión telenovelas
Venezuelan telenovelas
1995 Venezuelan television series debuts
1997 Venezuelan television series endings
Spanish-language telenovelas
Television shows set in Venezuela